The Prelude is a small sailing yacht, designed by Ian Proctor and built by Ridgeway Marine initially and later by Pegasus.

Dimensions

Keels 
The prelude is available in three different keel configurations:

Fin Keel 
The fin keel version has a draft of 1.15m (3'9")

Bilge Keel 
Also known as twin keel this version is easily trailerable, can be dried out and has a draft of 0.689m (2' 3")

Drop Keel 
Also known as a swing or lifting keel, this version has a draft of 1.38m (4'66") when the keel is down or 0.61m (2'0") when the keel is up.

Rigging 
The Prelude has a Bermuda rig can cab be supplied as ether a Standard (Fractional) or Masthead rig

Accommodation 

The cabin is generous for the size of the boat; comprising 4 full sized berths (minimum 1.86m or 6'1"), space for a chemical toilet and a small galley area with a sink, food store and space for a 2 burner hob.

The Prelude Owner Association 
The Prelude Owners Association is an active owners association which provides; Information on the class, a list of members boats' and there sailing areas, a gallery of photos and a forum of members who provide advice relating to the sailing and maintaining of Preludes.

External links 
The Prelude Owners Association

The Original Prelude Brochure

References

Boats designed by Ian Proctor